Vladimir Evgenievich Zotikov ( – November 12, 1970) was a prominent Russian and Soviet scientist and textile engineer best known for having developed the theory of cotton-spinning. He devoted his life to the study and improvement of mechanical technology of fibrous materials.

Life and work 
Born in Yalta, Crimea, his parents were Evgeny Zotikov, a mechanical engineer, and Elizaveta Zotikova née Savitskaya. He was educated first at home, then studied at Moscow private Realschule (Реальное училище) and Imperial Moscow Technical School (1911).

Honors
Honored Worker of Science and Technology of RSFSR (1963).

References 

1887 births
1970 deaths
People from Yalta
People from Taurida Governorate
Bauman Moscow State Technical University alumni
Academic staff of Moscow State Textile University
Soviet engineers